The 2021–22 Danish Women's 2nd Division (Danish: Danmarksturneringens 2. division i kvindefodbold 2021–22) was the first season of the new Danish nation-wide third-tier association football division since its establishment in November 2020 as part of the revised Danmarksturneringen i kvindefodbold's nation-wide league structure. Governed by the Danish FA, the season was launched on 14 August 2021 with two fixtures in the preliminary round (Ballerup-Skovlunde Fodbold vs Østerbro IF and Solrød FC vs BK Fremad Amager) and concluded with the last five matches on 13 November 2021. Østerbro IF, Solrød FC, Ballerup-Skovlunde Fodbold, Fredensborg BK&IF, FC Damsø, JAI Fodbold, IF Lyseng (AGF II), Aarhus 1900, IK Aalborg Freja and Fortuna Hjørring (II) entered as relegated teams from last season's second division, while Allerød FK, BK Fremad Amager, KoldingQ and Vejle BK entered as promoted teams from the last season's third-tier. The eleven first teams, excluding the reserve teams, in the division entered the 2021–22 Danish Women's Cup in the cup tournament's first round proper. The fixtures for the 2021–22 season were announced by the Danish FA's tournament committee and featured a twenty weeks long winter break.

Fortuna Hjørring withdrew their reserve team from the third division shortly before the start of the season. In September 2021, it was announced that KoldingQ would merge and become the new women's department of Kolding IF, which occurred at the end of October 2021. Østerbro IF finished on top of their group following the conclusion of the preliminary round, qualifying for a spot in the 1st Division play-off round against the lowest placed teams of the Danish Women's 1st Division, while JAI Fodbold qualified as the second best team in their group, after Kolding IF (reserves) in first place, due to reserve teams being ineligible for promotion.

Summary
The 2021–22 season was inaugurated on Saturday 14 August with two fixtures in the preliminary first round of the east group; Ballerup-Skovlunde Fodbold (BSF) and Østerbro IF, both teams relegated from the second division last season, played at Ballerup Idrætspark, and Solrød FC against BK Fremad Amager, one relegated team from the second-tier versus one promoted team from the Kvindeserien from last season, played at the football ground at Solrød Idrætscenter. Ballerup-Skovlunde Fodbold's Sille Kristine Lønstrup scored the first goal of the season, and the new nation-wide third division, in the 6th minute by outplaying the Østerbro IF's goalkeeper. Tanya Arngrimsen netted the second and third goal for Ballerup-Skovlunde in the 34th and 66th minutes, while Anne-Sophie Winther Svartstein of Østerbro IF scored the only goal for the away team after 48 minutes of play following a corner kick by Østerbro IF's Pernille Larsen, hence Ballerup-Skovlunde Fodbold secured a victory in the first match. The first round match between Fredensborg BK&IF and FC Damsø at Fredensborg Stadium got postponed to 15 September.

The first two matches of the west group was set for Sunday 15 August 2021, and featured Aarhus 1900 against IF Lyseng at Langenæs Idrætsanlæg (aka Fort Langelæs), both relegated from the second division last season, and the reserve team of KoldingQ versus IK Aalborg Freja at the artificial field on Fynske Bank Arena (aka KoldingQ's stadium). The first round match between Vejle BK and the reserve team of Fortuna Hjørring was cancelled. Fortuna Hjørring withdrew their reserve team from the third division shortly before the start of the season, citing economic difficulties having the same number of players on contracts due to the COVID-19 pandemic in Denmark and last minutes reductions to the roster, and was penalized with a DKK 3,000 fine by the Football Disciplinary Board of the Danish FA for having brought discredit to the league tournament and football in general. All of the scheduled league matches for Fortuna Hjørring were expunged from the calendar, reducing the number of teams in group 2 to six.

FC Damsø were compelled to cancel their away match against Østerbro IF on 21 August 2021 at Fælledparken, citing problems fielding a competitive first team for the match and with both goalkeepers being unable to played, which resulted in a DKK 1,500 fine and given a 3–0 loss by the Football Disciplinary Board. The main stadium ground at Vanløse Idrætspark was converted from grass to an artificial turf between 31 May and mid-September 2021, and FC Damsø had their home matches in the match calendar arranged to take place in later rounds, with the inaugural women's league match at the new stadium taking place on 18 September against Allerød FK. In September 2021, it was announced that KoldingQ would merge and become the women's department of Kolding IF Fodbold with KoldingQ's top-flight team becoming part of the professional branch and the reserve team being attached to the mother club of Kolding IF Fodbold, which occurred at the end of October 2021 – the first third division match under the Kolding IF Women banner was played on 31 October 2021 at the ground in Bramdrupdam.

At the conclusion of the preliminary rounds in the fall season, Østerbro IF had finished on top of their group, which qualified the club for a spot in the 1st Division play-off round against the bottom half of the 2021–22 Danish Women's 1st Division, while JAI Fodbold qualified as the second best team in their group. The reserves of Kolding IF finished in the top spot in the west group, but were not eligible to partake in the promotion play-off round. The largest victory in the preliminary rounds happened matchday 10, when Østerbro IF secured a 11–1 away win against BK Fremad Amager on 16 October at the artificial field next to the stadium at Sundby Idrætspark, with two players scoring hat-tricks.

Teams

Fourteen teams competed in the league – ten teams relegated from the second division of the previous season and four teams promoted from the old third division of the previous season. The promoted teams were Allerød FK, BK Fremad Amager and the reserve team of KoldingQ, who all entered the Danmarksturneringen for the first time in the club's history, while Vejle BK returned after a two-year absence. The relegated teams were  Østerbro IF, Solrød FC, Ballerup-Skovlunde Fodbold, Fredensborg BK&IF, FC Damsø, JAI Fodbold, IF Lyseng (AGF II), Aarhus 1900, IK Aalborg Freja and Fortuna Hjørring (II), who ended their spells in the second-tier of seven, one, one, one, eleven, two, five, three, one and four years respectively.

Stadiums and locations

Personnel

Coaching changes

Preliminary round

League table
Every team were scheduled to play two games against the other teams, at home and away, totaling 12 and 10 games each respectively. Teams received three points for a win and one point for a draw. If two or more teams were tied on points, places were determined by goal difference. The team with the most points at the end of the preliminary round, who do not have the status as a reserve team, qualify to play in the promotion round against the lowest placed teams of the second division, while the remaining teams continued to the 2nd Division play-off round.

Group 1 (east)

Group 2 (west)

Results

Group 1 (east)

‡: FC Damsø were compelled to cancel their away match against Østerbro IF on 21 August 2021 and was penalized with a 3–0 loss.

Group 2 (west)

‡: KoldingQ was merged into Kolding IF in late October 2021, playing their last three league matches of the fall season under the Kolding IF Women banner.

2nd Division play-off round

League table
Every team in the 2nd Division play-off round were scheduled to play two games against the other teams, at home and away, totaling 10 and 8 games each respectively. Teams received three points for a win and one point for a draw. If two or more teams were tied on points, places were determined by goal difference. The two teams with the fewest points in each group 1 (for the 2021–22 season, it is the lowest placed team in group 2) would be relegated to the 2022–23 Danish Women's Series. The teams are awarded starting points based on their placing at the conclusion of the preliminary rounds; second place gets five points, third place gets four points, fourth place gets three points, fifth place gets two points, sixth place gets one point and seventh place gets zero points, and the goal score is reset. The team with the most points in each group qualify to the 2nd Division championship final.

Group 1 (east)

Group 2 (west)

Results

Group 1 (east)

Group 2 (west)

Championship final
After the conclusion of the 2nd Division play-off rounds of the tournament, the winners of the two groups partake in a final to determine the overall winner of the third-tier. In even years, the rules stipulate that the final is played the home ground of the west group winner, while the east group winner get the home advantage in odd years. If the match ends in a draw, the match will be decided in accordance with the rules for the final of the Danish Women's Cup.

Statistics

Scoring

Group 1 (east) top scorers

Group 2 (west) top scorers

Hat-tricks

Clean sheets

References

2021–22 in European third tier association football leagues
2021–22 in Danish football